José Alfredo Santoyo González (born 15 April 1995) is a Mexican road and track cyclist, who currently rides for UCI Continental team . He won the gold medal at the 2016 Pan American Track Cycling Championships in the scratch.

As a junior he competed at the 2013 UCI Road World Championships in the junior road race.

References

External links

1995 births
Living people
Mexican male cyclists
Mexican track cyclists
Sportspeople from Jalisco
20th-century Mexican people
21st-century Mexican people